Double Dynamite is a compilation album by American singer and musician Elvis Presley. The album was released in December 1975, and compiles various tracks that had previously been released on nine budget-priced albums on the RCA Camden label. It was certified Gold and Platinum on 1/6/2004 by the RIAA.

A 16-track CD version of the album was released in 1987 by Pair/RCA Special Products.  The two songs omitted from the CD are "You'll Never Walk Alone" and "If You Think I Don't Need You".

Track listing

References

External links

Double Dynamite at Sergent.com.au

1975 compilation albums
Elvis Presley compilation albums